PJSC "KredoBank" (Ukrainian: АТ "Кредобанк") is the bank with the largest Polish investment in banking institution in Ukraine. Kredobank's national network contains 88 outlets throughout Ukraine. 100% of Kredobank's shares belong to PKO Bank Polski, the biggest bank of Poland. KREDOBANK is a member of the Independent Association of Ukrainian banks and European Business Association. Also, Kredobank is a member of such international payment systems, as  MasterCard Worldwide, Visa International and the Deposit Guarantee Fund. The bank has the highest national credit rank - uaAAA by Standart-Rating and Expert-Rating rating agencies.

History
The public joint-stock company Kredobank, the successor of JSC Kredyt Bank (Ukraine) and JSC West-Ukrainian Commercial Bank (ZUKB), was established in Lviv and was registered as a limited liability company in the State Bank of the former USSR on May 14, 1990 (registration number 289) and re-registered with the National Bank of Ukraine on October 14, 1991 (registration number 24). On February 21, 1992 at the General Shareholders Meeting ZUKB transformed into open joint-stock company (bank registration certificate number 96 on 31.03.1992). According to the Extraordinary General Shareholders Meeting on August 17, 2001 the bank changed its name from JSC West-Ukrainian Commercial Bank to JSC Kredyt Bank (Ukraine), and therefore the Extraordinary General Shareholders Meeting on October 26, 2001 made the appropriate changes in the Charter of the bank. In 2004, the process of changing the strategic investor of JSC Kredyt Bank (Ukraine) has been finished. There was the sale of shares (whole package - 66.65%) of Kredyt Bank SA (Warsaw) in Warsaw, in favor of the most powerful Polish bank  PKO Bank Polski SA. As a result, the Extraordinary General Shareholders Meeting of JSC Kredyt Bank (Ukraine) was held on November 17, 2005, where shareholders approved replacing the old name of the bank by new one, which is the open joint-stock company Kredobank. On March 1, 2006 bank officially changed its name to PJSC Kredobank.

Since September 2013, the bank has been rebranded. On September 5 the updated logo of the bank was presented. The new logo of Kredobank, made in the corporate style of the strategic investor of the bank - the largest bank in Poland PKO Bank Polski SA, symbolizes the European approach to the conditions and standards of customer service, and in the future - simplification of the processes of providing banking services.

The service network of Kredobank is 82 branches in 22 regions of Ukraine and in Kyiv. Net assets as of July 1, 2021 amounted to UAH 27,339.6 million, by their size Kredobank is one of the twenty largest banks in Ukraine. Net profit as of July 1, 2021 amounted to more than UAH 423.9 million, by its size Kredobank is also among the twenty most profitable banks in Ukraine.

Structure

Dynamic growth of Kredobank rates, entering new geographic markets, expanding the range of services, implementing new banking technologies causes the need for continuous change in the organizational structure of the bank and building the new one that would allow rapid response to change market conditions. As of May 1, 2020, the organizational structure of PJSC Kredobank is formed with the main bank and 88 outlets. PJSC Kredobank employs over 2,000 people, most people with high levels of financial and economic education, dominated by the number of young people under 35 years of age. Business training for personnel is carried out with the assistance of international institutions: the British Know How Fund, and Western Ukrainian initiative ACDI / VOCA (Agriculture Co-operative Development International). Considerable assistance in training is provided by PKO BP SA, in which personnel is trained and gains experience with the Polish financial markets.

See also 

List of banks in Ukraine

References

External links

  

Banks of Ukraine
Banks of the Soviet Union
Companies based in Lviv